DYRL (1035 AM) Radyo Pilipino is a radio station owned and operated by Radyo Pilipino Media Group through its licensee Radyo Pilipino Corporation. Its studio and transmitter are located along Cameroli Ave., Brgy. Rodriguez Baybay, Bacolod. Despite its current branding, it is still known as Abyan Radyo.

References

Radio stations established in 1956
Radio stations in Bacolod